Urbici Soler (Urbici Soler i Manonelles) (1890–1953) was an American sculptor and art educator. He is remembered chiefly for Cristo Rey ('Christ the King'), a monumental statue of Jesus on the cross atop Mount Cristo Rey in the El Paso suburb of Sunland Park, New Mexico, which he completed in 1939 and which is a site of Roman Catholic pilgrimage.

Life

Urbici Soler was born on June 21, 1890, in Ferran, Lleida, in Catalonia, Spain. He was a student of Pere Carbonell i Huguet. Soler also studied at night at the Escola de la Llotja in Barcelona. In 1913, Soler became a student of Adolph von Hildebrand in Munich. He completed his first monumental sculpture, Princess María de la Paz, in 1918, and also studied with Emile Antoine Bourdelle in Paris before returning to Spain, when he was called to South America. Soler's most important collection, The World, is a study of the native peoples of Mexico, Central America, and South America. The Spanish Civil War prevented his return to Spain. In 1937 he was called to work on Christ the King.

Soler was twice married, including a brief marriage in 1940 to Bettie Binkley of Santa Fe, New Mexico. Neither marriage was successful. He then moved to New Orleans, California, New York, and South America in 1943, returning to El Paso in 1945 to attempt further work on Christ the King, and joined the faculty of the Texas School of Mines, now called the University of Texas at El Paso. He became a US citizen in 1949. Soler built a house at the foot of Mount Cristo Rey in Anapra, New Mexico, (now part of Sunland Park) and lived there until his death on January 15, 1953. The Texas Historical Commission placed a marker at his gravesite in Evergreen Cemetery in El Paso in 1984.

The statue Christ the King

The statue Christ the King was inspired by a papal call for mementos of the 1900th anniversary of the coming of Christ. The project was begun at the behest of Father Lourdes Costa, pastor of the Smeltertown parish, which covered both the New Mexico and the Texas sides of the Rio Grande. Costa got funding from the Diocese of El Paso to purchase  from the New Mexico Public Land Office for the statue, and to build a cross. Costa first erected a wood cross, then a steel cross built by the efforts of the Smeltertown parish, on the summit of Cerro de Muleros (now called Mount Cristo Rey), the northernmost peak of the Juarez Mountains, located on the border of the United States and Mexico. Costa, like Soler, was Catalan, and Soler stayed with him while working on the statue.

The blocks were chosen by Soler and winched up the mountain. Soler carved it on-site with an air chisel. The head of the statue is elongated so that the figure appears of natural proportions when viewed from below. The statue is not technically a crucifix, as the palms of Christ face downward in a gesture of blessing. The statue was completed in 1939 and dedicated in 1940. The diocese ran short of money, but Soler completed the front of the statue with his own funds.

Works by Soler
Cabeza de Estudio (1907)
Princess María de la Paz (1918)
The World, 1920s - 1940s, a collection of studies of native peoples
Charlotte Dahmen Chao (1925)
Diego Rivera (1931), sandstone
Abelardo Rodríguez (1932)
Enrique González Martínez (1934)
Cristo Rey (1939), limestone
Tom Lea (1946) bronze
Fresia (1946), hardwood
Mater Dolorosa (1950), modernist

Notes
Celebratory masses on the Feast of Christ the King and a pilgrimage to the top of the mountain are held annually in October. The Stations of the Cross line the trail up the mountainside. By tradition, the mass ends with the shout Long live Christ the King.
 p. 54 Tom Lea: an Oral History 
After the success of the project, Cerro de Muleros (Mule Drivers' Mountain) was renamed Mount Cristo Rey. In 1991, a lightning strike damaged the statue and dislodged several  limestone blocks, which were retrieved from down the mountainside.
 El Paso Times Mount Cristo Rey once a figure of peace now a symbol of struggle

References

External links
Bernice Zuniga & Terri Fout, King on the Mountain
Paul Daniggelis, "Urbici Soler", Handbook of Texas Online [Paul Daniggelis, "Rodant Pel Mon", International Association for the Visual Arts, 1995, El Paso]

1890 births
1953 deaths
Sculptors from Catalonia
Artists from El Paso, Texas
Sculptors from New Mexico
University of Texas at El Paso faculty
Christ the King
Sculptors from Texas
People from Lleida
Spanish emigrants to the United States
People from Doña Ana County, New Mexico
American people of Catalan descent
20th-century sculptors